(), or Route 49, is a major traffic artery in Reykjavík, Iceland. It is one of the two main roads running across Capital Region, the other being Kringlumýrarbraut.

Roads in Iceland